Marianela González (born 23 July 1978 in Caracas, Venezuela) is a Venezuelan actress and model. Now lives in Colombia. Her parents are María del Carmen Álvarez "Carmenchu" and José Rafael González. She has one sister named María Alejandra. She is best known for her role as Pandora Villenueva in the telenovela Mi Gorda Bella and Renata in the novel La Traicionera.

Personal life
Marianela's birth name was Marianela Aime González Álvarez. Her eyes and hair are dark brown colored and she is 1,70 metres (5' 7") high. Her father is an airline pilot and because of it her family has had the opportunity to travel. Her mother is from Spain from Asturias.

In real life she is good friends with her fellow actress Aileen Celeste. The two of them have co-starred in three telenovelas: La Niña de mis Ojos, Mi Gorda Bella and Por todo lo Alto. She is really good friend with actor Luciano D'Alessandro.

Marianela's favorite color is red and her favorite book is "A orillas del río Piedra me senté y lloré" by Paolo Coelho. Her favorite actors are Robert De Niro and Julia Roberts. Her favorite song is Ronan Keatings "When you say nothing at all" from the movie Notting Hill. Her favorite food is sushi.

When asked to describe herself in three words she said she was bad-mannered, positive and generous. She also said that her best quality is being a really good friend. The worst defect she considered to have was that she always relied on reason and wanted to have the last word on everything. She said that she is most happy when she is in the company of her friends and loved ones. And most sad when she is alone. She is not hot-tempered, but she can be jealous. Marianela's ideal partner would be sincere, diligent, intelligent, understanding and someone who would appreciate her as she is. She believes in marriage, but not in love at first sight.

Nela is very cautious about publishing information about her private life. Everything changed at the end of December 2018, when just before Christmas, she published her relationship with the Colombian writer Amalia Andrade via Instagram. She admitted her bisexual orientation for the first time with this confession. Nela and Amalia have two cats - Carmen and Rio.

Filmography

External links 
 
 Marianela González https://web.archive.org/web/20080225060423/http://www.rctv.net/Biografias/VerBiografia.aspx?BiografiaId=171 in the RCTV.net web pages.

1978 births
Living people
Actresses from Caracas
Venezuelan telenovela actresses
Venezuelan people of Spanish descent
Venezuelan LGBT actors
LGBT models